San Gregorio da Sassola is a  (municipality) in the Metropolitan City of Rome in the Italian region of Latium, located about  east of Rome.

San Gregorio da Sassola borders the following municipalities: Capranica Prenestina, Casape, Castel Madama, Ciciliano, Poli, Rome, Tivoli.

In antiquity, the Aequian town of Aefula mentioned by both Pliny and Livy was situated within the bounds of the modern .

Twin towns
 Hammonton, United States

References

Cities and towns in Lazio